The Umatilla National Forest, in the Blue Mountains of northeast Oregon and southeast Washington, covers an area of 1.4 million acres (5,700 km2). In descending order of land area the forest is located in parts of Umatilla, Grant, Columbia, Morrow, Wallowa, Union, Garfield, Asotin, Wheeler, and Walla Walla counties. (Columbia, Garfield, Asotin, and Walla Walla counties are in Washington, while the rest are in Oregon.) More than three-quarters of the forest lies in the state of Oregon. Forest headquarters are located in Pendleton, Oregon. There are local ranger district offices in Heppner and Ukiah in Oregon, and in Pomeroy and Walla Walla in Washington.

Human history

The Umatilla National Forest takes its name from the Umatilla Indian word meaning "water rippling over sand."  Explorers Lewis and Clark passed through the area in 1805 on the Columbia River, and Marcus and Narcissa Whitman passed through in 1836 to establish a mission at Wailatpu near Walla Walla, Washington.  Thousands of emigrants later followed the Oregon Trail west, and many remained in the Blue Mountain region.  Discovery of gold in Oregon in 1851 led to the settlement of the North Fork John Day River area. More than $10 million in gold and silver were mined, and remnants of the era are still visible in the National Forest.  Some claims are still being mined.

Umatilla was established on July 1, 1908 from part of Blue Mountains National Forest and all of Heppner National Forest.  Wenaha National Forest was added on November 5, 1920.

The forest was the site of the School Fire, the largest fire in the contiguous United States of 2005.

Wildlife
Common wildlife in the Umatilla National Forest include moose, elk, bighorn sheep, black bear, mountain goat, mule deer, white-tailed deer, timber wolf, cougar, coyote, badger, Merriam's turkeys, transplanted Rio Grande wild turkeys, blue and ruffed grouse, Franklin's grouse, chinook salmon, coho salmon, steelhead, rainbow trout, brook trout, and lake trout.

Wilderness
More than 20 percent of the Umatilla National Forest is classified as wilderness:
Wenaha–Tucannon Wilderness, 177,400 acres (718 km2), straddles the border between Oregon and Washington.
North Fork John Day Wilderness, 121,800 acres (493 km2), is in the southeast section of the National Forest and located partly in neighboring Whitman National Forest.
North Fork Umatilla Wilderness, 20,200 acres (82 km2), contains the narrow valley of the North Fork Umatilla River, the source of the Umatilla River.

Vegetation

Recreation
Common recreational activities in the Umatilla National Forest include OHV riding, camping, hiking, fishing, hunting, wildlife watching, skiing, and rafting.
Spout Springs Ski Area in Oregon and Bluewood Ski Area in Washington operate under special use permit within the forest. Jubilee Lake has the most popular campground in the forest.

See also

 List of U.S. National Forests

References

External links
 Umatilla National Forest, USDA Forest Service

 
National Forests of Oregon
National Forests of Washington (state)
Protected areas of Umatilla County, Oregon
Protected areas of Grant County, Oregon
Protected areas of Columbia County, Washington
Protected areas of Morrow County, Oregon
Protected areas of Wallowa County, Oregon
Protected areas of Union County, Oregon
Protected areas of Garfield County, Washington
Protected areas of Asotin County, Washington
Protected areas of Wheeler County, Oregon
Protected areas of Walla Walla County, Washington
1908 establishments in Oregon
Protected areas established in 1908
1908 establishments in Washington (state)